The Provisional Government of the Algerian Republic (French: Gouvernement provisoire de la République algérienne) was the government-in-exile of the Algerian National Liberation Front (FLN) during the latter part of the Algerian War of Independence (1954–62).

Creation and purpose 
The GPRA was set up in Cairo, Egypt, by the FLN on September 19, 1958, four years into the Algerian War of Independence. Its first President was the moderate nationalist Ferhat Abbas, who had for decades insisted on trying to peacefully reform the French colonial system, before finally despairing and joining the FLN's armed struggle. He was once re-elected to the post, in 1960, but as early as the following year he was sidelined and replaced by Benyoucef Benkhedda, who held the presidency as Algeria was declared independent.

The purpose of the GPRA was to serve as a diplomatic and political tool for the FLN. It allowed sympathetic governments to extend official recognition to it (among those that did were neighbouring Morocco and Tunisia, as well as Nasserite Egypt, other Arab countries, and Pakistan). Its headquarters were located in Tunis, but diplomats were posted in most major world capitals to try to lobby governments and organize local support groups. It was partly intended to serve as a preemptive diplomatic strike against a proposal by French President Charles de Gaulle to hold a referendum by which Algeria would be given an autonomous status within France.

1962 Algerian crisis 

After the war, the Algerian crisis period began and infighting broke out in FLN ranks. Benkhedda of the GPRA briefly held power in Tizi Ouzou, but there was no unified power for the whole country. Ahmed Ben Bella entered Algeria with the National Liberation Army (ALN) and established his headquarters in Tlemcen in July. By 9 September, the ALN entered Algiers and Ben Bella declared that the crisis ended. In late 1962, the GPRA was disbanded, after Ahmed Ben Bella seized power through forming a rival institution (a Political Bureau of the FLN) with the backing of the National Liberation Army (ALN), controlled by Col. Houari Boumédiène. An attempt by GPRA politicians and loyal guerrilla units to resist the military-backed takeover was crushed in a short but intense burst of internal fighting. A compromise forced by Boumédiène saw most of the provisional government enter an expanded Political Bureau, and the GPRA itself was dissolved. A one-party state under Ben Bella's command was then set up, after a constitution had been approved in elections by 99.6% of voters for the new republic.

While some argue that this broke the institutional continuity between the war-time GPRA and the present Algerian state, the Algerian presidency and government is still normally regarded as the GPRA's post-independence successor.

List of members of the GPRA 
The GPRA was reformed twice, in 1960 and 1961, with the change of ministers and portfolios to some extent reflecting the shifts of power within the FLN. Below is a list of the three versions of the GPRA.

The first GPRA: 1958–60

 Ferhat Abbas – President
 Colonel Krim Belkacem – Vice President and Minister of the Armed Forces
 Ahmed Ben Bella – Minister of State
 Hocine Aït Ahmed – Minister of State
 Rabah Bitat – Minister of State
 Mohamed Boudiaf – Minister of State
 Mohamed Khider – Minister of State
 Mohamed Lamine Debaghine – Minister of Foreign Affairs
 Mahmoud Cherif – Minister of Armaments and Provisions
 Lakhdar Ben Tobbal –  Minister of the Interior
 Abdelhafid Boussouf – Minister of General Relations and Communications
 Abdelhamid Mehri – Minister of Maghreb Affairs
 Ahmed Francis – Minister of Economic and Financial Affairs
 Mhamed Yazid – Minister of Information
 Benyoucef Benkhedda – Minister of Social Affairs
 Ahmed Tewfik El Madani – Minister of Cultural Affairs

Ministerial reshuffle at 15 March 1959 
 Lamine Khene – Secretary of State
 Omar Oussedik – Secretary of State
 Mustapha Stambouli

The second GPRA: 1960–61

 Ferhat Abbas – President
 Colonel Krim Belkacem – Vice President, and Minister of Foreign Affairs
 Ahmed Ben Bella – Minister of State
 Hocine Aït Ahmed – Minister of State
 Rabah Bitat – Minister of State
 Mohamed Boudiaf – Minister of State
 Mohamed Khider – Minister of State
 Colonel Saïd Mohammedi – Minister of State
 Abdelhamid Mehri – Minister of Social and Cultural Affairs
 Abdelhafid Boussouf – Minister of Armaments and of General Relations
 Ahmed Francis – Minister of Economic and Financial Affairs
 Mhamed Yazid – Minister of Information
 Lakhdar Ben Tobbal – Minister of the Interior

The third GPRA: 1961–62
 Benyoucef Benkhedda – President, and Minister of Economic and Financial Affairs
 Colonel Krim Belkacem – Vice President, Minister of the Interior of Foreign Affairs
 Ahmed Ben Bella – Vice President
 Mohamed Boudiaf – Vice President
 Hocine Aït Ahmed – Minister of State
 Rabah Bitat – Minister of State
 Mohamed Khider – Minister of State
 Lakhdar Ben Tobbal – Minister of State
 Colonel Saïd Mohammedi – Minister of State
 Saad Dahlab – Minister of Foreign Affairs
 Abdelhafid Boussouf – Minister of Armamaments and of General Relations
 Mhamed Yazid – Minister of Information

References

Literature
 Achour Cheurfi, La classe politique algérienne, de 1900 à nos jours. Dictionnaire biographique (Casbah Editions, 2nd edition, Algiers 2006)
 Jacques Duchemin, Histoire du F. L. N. (Editions Mimouni, Algiers 2006)
 Benjamin Stora, Algeria. 1830-2000. A Short History (Cornell University Press, United States 2004)
 Alistair Horne, A Savage War of Peace. Algeria 1954-1962 (Viking 1978)

Algerian War
Algeria
Algeria

Separatism in Algeria
Separatism in France
Algeria–Egypt relations
National Liberation Front (Algeria)